Amerosporium is a genus of fungi belonging to the family Sclerotiniaceae.

The genus was described in 1882 by Carlo Luigi Spegazzini.

The genus has cosmopolitan distribution.

Species:
 Amerosporium atrum (Fuckel) Höhn., 1915
 Amerosporium caricum
 Amerosporium concinnum Petr., 1953
 Amerosporium congregatum (Cooke) Sacc., 1884
 Amerosporium platense Speg., 1902
 Amerosporium polynematoides Speg., 1882

References

Sclerotiniaceae
Taxa named by Carlo Luigi Spegazzini